This is a list of episodes for the children's television series of Little Bear. There are 65 total episodes listed here.

Series overview

Episodes

Season 1 (1995–96)

Season 2 (1996–97)

Season 3 (1997–99)

Season 4 (1999)

Season 5 (2000–01)

References

External links
 

Lists of Canadian children's animated television series episodes
Lists of Nickelodeon television series episodes